Borivoje Ristić (born 19 September 1983) is a Serbian footballer who plays as a goalkeeper for Radnički Beograd.

Honours
BASK
Serbian First League (1): 2010–11
Čukarički
Serbian Cup (1): 2014–15

External links
 
 Borivoje Ristić profile at Utakmica.rs 

Living people
1983 births
Sportspeople from Leskovac
Serbian footballers
Association football goalkeepers
Serbian First League players
Serbian SuperLiga players
Slovenian PrvaLiga players
FK Mačva Šabac players
FK Vojvodina players
FK Metalac Gornji Milanovac players
FK Sevojno players
FK Teleoptik players
FK BASK players
FK Novi Pazar players
FK Čukarički players
FK Radnik Surdulica players
NK Rudar Velenje players
FK Radnički Niš players
Xewkija Tigers F.C. players
FK Radnički Beograd players
Serbian expatriate footballers
Serbian expatriate sportspeople in Slovenia
Expatriate footballers in Slovenia
Serbian expatriate sportspeople in Greece
Expatriate footballers in Greece
Serbian expatriate sportspeople in Malta
Expatriate footballers in Malta